Werner Windhaus was a German bobsledder who competed in the late 1930s. He won two medals in the four-man event at the FIBT World Championships with a silver in 1938 and a bronze in 1939.

References
Bobsleigh four-man world championship medalists since 1930

German male bobsledders
Year of birth missing
Possibly living people